The women's 400 metres at the 2022 World Athletics Indoor Championships took place on 18 and 19 March 2022.

Summary
Shaunae Miller-Uibo entered these championships with no other races this season, but as the two time Olympic gold medalist, her credentials preceded her.  Each round was a season best for her.  After being the #3 semi-finalist, she was drawn into lane 6, the widest turn favorable to her long stride.  

Running two turns in lanes before breaking, Miller-Uibo reached the cones with the slightest of a margin ahead of Femke Bol, the #3 400 metres hurdler of all time outdoors.  As the athletes collapsed to lane 1, Miller-Uibo's long strides put her solidly into the lead ahead of Bol, as the rest of the competitors fell into line behind them.  Aliyah Abrams and Lieke Klaver traded elbows as Klaver kept Abrams to the outside, while Abrams maintained a slight advantage but couldn't get in front.  Other than that battle, the finish order was set with a lap to go.  Bol could make no headway against Miller-Uibo.  Stephenie Ann McPherson made a run at Bol on the final straight out couldn't catch her.

Results

Heats
Qualification: First 2 in each heat (Q) and the next 2 fastest (q) advance to the Semi-Finals

The heats were started on 18 March at 11:41.

Semifinals
Qualification: First 3 in each heat (Q) advance to the Final

The heats were started on 18 March at 18:36.

Final
The final was started on 19 March at 19:55

References

400 metres
400 metres at the World Athletics Indoor Championships